Saudi Arabia participated in the 2012 Summer Paralympics in London, United Kingdom, from August 29 to September 9.

Although the country sent female athletes for the first time to the London Olympics, under pressure from the International Olympic Committee, its Paralympic delegation to the London Games remains, as previously, exclusively male. The Kingdom is represented by three athletes in track and field, and one in powerlifting.

Medallists

Athletics

Osamah Al-Shanqiti, who won the country's first ever Olympic or Paralympic gold medal at the Beijing Paralympics, in the triple jump, attempted to defend his title in the men's triple jump F12 (a category for athletes with severe visual impairment). He also competed in the shot put (F11-12).

Saeed Alkhaldi competed in the men's 100m T46 (for athletes with disabilities to the upper limbs or torso).

Hani Alnakhli competed in the men's shot put F32-33 (tetraplegia) and in the men's discus throw F32-34.

Men's Track and Road Events

Men's Field Events

Powerlifting

Bassam Al-Hawal competed in the men's under 100kg event.

Men

See also
Summer Paralympic disability classification
Saudi Arabia at the Paralympics
Saudi Arabia at the 2012 Summer Olympics

Notes

Nations at the 2012 Summer Paralympics
2012
Paralympics